The 1996 Fangoria Chainsaw Awards ceremony, presented by Fangoria magazine and Creation Entertainment, honored the best horror films of 1995 and took place on June 29, 1996, at the LAX Wyndham in Los Angeles, California. For the second year in a row, the ceremony was hosted by comedians Rick Overton and Scott LaRose.

Ceremony
The event was held as part of Fangoria'''s annual Weekend of Horrors convention, in partnership with Creation Entertainment. Attendees at the convention included special effects artist Gabe Bartalos, Ken Foree, Betsy Palmer, and Dick Warlock.

Presenters
 David Arnold - presenter of Best Score 
 Stephen Geoffreys and Virginya Keehne - presenters of Best Supporting Actor and Best Supporting Actress
 Larry Cohen - presenter of Best Screenplay 
 Chris Nelson - presenter of Best Makeup EFX 
 Johnny Legend - presenter of Worst Film
 Vivian Schilling - presenter of Best Actress
 Jeffrey Combs - presenter of Best Actor 
 William Lustig - presenter of Best Limited Release/Direct-to-Video Film 
 Mick Garris - presenter of Best Wide-Release Film 
 Rick Overton and Scott LaRose - presenters of Fangoria'' Hall of Fame Award

Winners and nominees

Awards

Fangoria Hall of Fame Award
Christopher Lee
Christopher Walken

External links
1996 Fangoria Chainsaw Award Winners

Fangoria Chainsaw Awards
Fangoria Chainsaw Awards
Fangoria Chainsaw Awards
1996 in Los Angeles
1996 in American cinema